Morrison Road is a major road that runs through the suburbs of Woodbridge, Midland, Midvale and Swan View, in the east of Perth, Western Australia.

It connects with other major roads and highways including Roe Highway, Lloyd Street, Great Northern Highway and Great Eastern Highway. It also plays a major role in bringing in traffic into the Midland city centre.

With sections of the road originally named Woodbridge Terrace and Boundary Road, the road was later given the one name of Morrison Road after James Morrison, who was responsible for subdividing land along the southern side of the road in 1897.

The section west of Great Northern Highway is part of National Route 1. It connects the route from that highway to Great Eastern Highway.

Major intersections

See also

References

Roads in Perth, Western Australia
Highway 1 (Australia)